Miriam Odinchezo Iruaku Ikejiani-Clark (1949 - 2011) was a Nigerian Professor of Political Science at the University of Nigeria Nsukka, Enugu State, who also served as minister of state for the Federal Capital Territory.

Education and career 
She was born at the University College Ibadan to late Okechukwu Ikejiani and late Mrs. Miriam Margery Carter Ikejiani on July 8, 1949. She earned a B.A. in political history from Eastern Mennonite University in 1969, and then received her M.A. degree in political science from Howard University in 1971. She did post-graduate studies at Catholic University in Washington DC with a graduate fellowship in politics. Ikejiani-Clark was the first woman professor of political science at the University of Nigeria, and from 1997 to 1999 she was the head of the department of political science. She also served as the dean (2007 until 2009). From 2002 until 2004 she was the editor of the Nigerian Journal of Social Sciences.

In 2019, a memorial lecture in Ikejiani-Clark's honor was established at the University of Nigeria, and Governor Samuel Ortom gave the inaugural lecture.

Political career 
Ikejiani-Clark from 1992 to 1993 served as the Chairman Social Democratic Party (SDP) Anambra State and led the Anambra state Delegation to the National SDP Convention in Jos in 1994. She equally served as a member of the National Constitutional Conference, Commission. Between March 1995 to November 1997 Ikejiani-Clark served as minister of state for the Federal Capital Territory, the first woman to serve in this position. She focused on improving conditions for the poor. In 2008, late President Musa Yar'dua appointed her as a member of the presidential committee on honours & awards. In 2009 she spoke on an electoral act in Nigeria, which she felt allowed politicians to manipulate the period they spent in office.

Selected publications

Personal life 
Ikejiani-Clark died at the National Hospital, Abuja on September 22, 2011. She was married to Chuba Okadigbo and they had four children before getting divorced.

References 

Nigerian political scientists
Women political scientists
Eastern Mennonite University alumni
Howard University alumni
Catholic University of America alumni
1949 births
2011 deaths